Cylindroleberididae is a family of ostracods that shows remarkable morphological diversity. The defining feature is the possession of gills: 7–8 leaf-like pairs at the posterior of the body. Other features common to all species in the family include a "baleen-comb" on both the maxilla and the fifth limb, a sword-shaped coxal endite on the mandible, and the triaenid bristles on the basal endites of the mandible.

In 2006, there were 219 described species.

A fossil discovered in 2003 with preserved soft parts has been assigned to the Cylindroleberididae.

Subtaxa
Cylindroleberididae contains the following subfamilies and genera.
Asteropteroninae Kornicker, 1981
Actinoseta Kornicker, 1958
Asteropteron Skogsberg, 1920
Asteropterygion Kornicker, 1981
Microasteropteron Poulsen, 1965
Omegasterope Kornicker, 1981
Pteromeniscus Kornicker, 1981
†Siveterella Kornicker & Sohn, 2000
†Triadocypris Weitschat, 1983
†Triadogigantocypris Monostori, 1991
Asteropella Poulsen, 1965 (nomen nudum)
Cyclasteropinae Poulsen, 1965
Alphaleberis Kornicker, 1981
Amboleberis Kornicker, 1981
Cyclasterope Brady, 1897
Cycloleberis Skogsberg, 1920
†Eocypridina Kesling & Ploch, 1960
Leuroleberis Kornicker, 1981
†Mesoleberis Kornicker, van bakel, Fraaije & Jagt, 2006
†Radiicypridina Bless, 1973
Tetraleberis Kornicker, 1981
Cylindroleberidinae Müller, 1906
Archasterope Poulsen, 1965
†Asteropina Strand, 1928
Bathyleberis Kornicker, 1975
Bruuniella Poulsen, 1965
Cylindroleberis Brady, 1867
Diasterope Kornicker, 1975
Dolasterope Poulsen, 1965
Domromeus Kornicker, 1989
Empoulsenia Kornicker, 1975
Heptonema Poulsen, 1965
Homasterope Kornicker, 1975
Monasterope Kornicker, 1991
Parasterope Kornicker, 1975
Philippiella Poulsen, 1965
Polyleberis Kornicker, 1974
Postasterope Kornicker, 1986
Prionotoleberis Kornicker, 1974
Skogsbergiella Kornicker, 1975
Synasterope Kornicker, 1975
Xandarasterope Kornicker in Kornicker & Poore, 1996
Xenoleberis Kornicker, 1994
Macroasteropteroninae Karanovic & Lörz, 2012
Macroasteropteron Kornicker, 1994
genera incertae sedis
†Colymbosathon Siveter, Sutton, Briggs & Siveter, 2003
†Juraleberis Vannier & Siveter, 1995
†Nasunaris Siveter, Briggs, Siveter & Sutton, 2010
†Pauline Siveter, Briggs, Siveter, Sutton & Joomun, 2012

References

External links

Interactive key to species

Myodocopida
Ostracod families
Extant Silurian first appearances